Ronnie Garrison Stanley (born March 18, 1994) is an American football offensive tackle for the Baltimore Ravens of the National Football League (NFL). He played college football at Notre Dame. Stanley was drafted by the Ravens 6th overall in the first round of the 2016 NFL Draft and earned Pro Bowl and first-team All-Pro honors in 2019.

Early years
Stanley attended Bishop Gorman High School in Las Vegas, Nevada. Here, he played varsity basketball and football, with his main sport being the latter.

He was ranked by Rivals.com as a four-star recruit, and was rated as the 15th best offensive tackle prospect of his class. In December 2011, Stanley committed to the University of Notre Dame to play college football.

College career

Stanley played in two games as a true freshman in 2012 in a reserve role. As a sophomore in 2013, he started all 13 games at right tackle, and was part of an offensive line that allowed just eight sacks and ranked second in the FBS in fewest sacks allowed. As a junior in 2014, he moved to left tackle, taking over for Zack Martin. He started all 13 games, allowing only just one sack all year. He contemplated entering the 2015 NFL draft, but ultimately decided to return to Notre Dame for his senior season. After his senior season, he officially announced to enter the 2016 NFL draft.

Professional career

2016
The Baltimore Ravens selected Stanley in the first round (sixth overall) of the 2016 NFL Draft. Stanley was the first offensive lineman drafted in 2016 after the unexpected draft slide of Laremy Tunsil. On May 13, 2016, the Baltimore Ravens signed Stanley to a fully guaranteed, four-year, $20.48 million rookie contract, with a signing bonus of $13.09 million.

Stanley entered training camp slated as the starting left tackle after it was left vacant due to the departure of Eugene Monroe. Head coach John Harbaugh named Stanley the starting left tackle to begin the regular season. He made his professional regular season debut and first career start in the Baltimore Ravens' 13–7 victory against the Buffalo Bills. Stanley sustained a foot injury and was sidelined for four games (Weeks 4–7). He started in 12 games as a rookie season in 2016 and gave up three sacks and was responsible for 22 quarterback hurries. Stanley received an overall grade of 81.1 from Pro Football Focus in 2016 and ranked as the 17th best left tackle. He received the third highest grade among all rookie offensive tackles, behind Tennessee Titans' offensive tackle Jack Conklin and Detroit Lions' offensive tackle Taylor Decker.

2017
Stanley retained his role as the starting left tackle under new offensive coordinator Marty Mornhinweg. Head coach John Harbaugh named Stanley the starter to begin the regular season. On  November 5, 2017, Stanley suffered a concussion during a 23–20 loss at the Tennessee Titans in Week 9. He remained in concussion protocol and was inactive for the Ravens' Week 11 win at the Green Bay Packers. He started in 15 games in 2017 and was responsible for giving up three sacks and 23 quarterback hurries. Stanley ranked as the 13th best left tackle in 2017 and received an overall grade of 76.2 from Pro Football Focus.

2018
Head coach John Harbaugh retained Stanley as the starting left tackle to begin the regular season in 2018. He started 15 games there, missing one due to an ankle injury.

2019
On April 23, 2019, the Ravens picked up the fifth-year option on Stanley's contract. Stanley continued his development blocking for QB Lamar Jackson and Running Backs Mark Ingram and Gus Edwards, which by week 15 broke Ravens scoring record set in 2014. On December 13, 2019, Pro Football Focus called Ronnie Stanley "The best pass blocking tackle in the NFL". On January 3, 2020, Stanley was designated a First-team All-Pro.

2020 
On October 30, 2020, the Ravens signed Stanley to a five-year contract extension worth $112.8M in maximum total value, making him the highest paid offensive lineman in the NFL. On November 1, 2020, in a Week 8 game against the Pittsburgh Steelers, Stanley was carted off the field with a season-ending ankle injury. He was placed on injured reserve two days later.

2021
Stanley was placed on injured reserve after undergoing season-ending ankle surgery on October 19, 2021.

NFL career statistics

References

External links

Baltimore Ravens bio
Notre Dame Fighting Irish bio

1994 births
Living people
American football offensive tackles
Notre Dame Fighting Irish football players
Players of American football from Nevada
Bishop Gorman High School alumni
Sportspeople from Las Vegas
American people of Tongan descent
All-American college football players
Baltimore Ravens players
American Conference Pro Bowl players